SZSE 300 Price Index and its sub-indexes SZSE 100 Price Index and SZSE 200 Price Index were the stock market indices of Shenzhen Stock Exchange, representing top 300 companies by free float adjusted market capitalization. The sub-indices represented top 100 companies and next 200 (the 101st to 300th) companies, respectively. SZSE 300 Index itself is a sub-index of SZSE Component Index, SZSE 1000 Index and SZSE Composite Index.

The index series also had a counterpart which calculated in different methodology, as SZSE 300 Return Index, SZSE 100 Return Index and SZSE 200 Return Index.

Constituents

SZSE 100 Sub-Index

SZSE 200 Sub-Index

Change history

References
general
 
specific

Chinese stock market indices
Shenzhen Stock Exchange